The Clydebank Co-operative Society Limited is the smallest consumers' co-operative in Scotland, based in the town of Clydebank near Glasgow.  Along with Scotmid and The Co-operative Group, it is one of three consumer co-operative retail societies in Scotland, and the only one not merged into a regional or national society.

Unusually for co-operatives in the United Kingdom, it is not a member of Co-operatives UK. However, in its founding year of 1881, it joined the Scottish Co-operative Wholesale Society. Before the second world war, community leader Jenny Hyslop was one of the society's organisers.

Until 2013, Clydebank Co-op had buying arrangements with the Co-operative Retail Trading Group (CRTG), a buying group managed by The Co-operative Group, the successor of SCWS, which also manages The Co-operative brand.

In 2013/2014, Clydebank Co-op left the CRTG, agreeing to buy from local wholesaler JW Filshill, and co-brand its six stores with Filshill's KeyStore brand.

Stores

, the society operates seven food stores ranging from just over 6,500 square  feet at Dunn Street, to its smallest, at Great Western Road & Sylvania Way South, Clydebank
 Great Western Road, Knightswood
 Faifley Road, Faifley
 Sylvania Way South, Clydebank
 Kilbowie Road, Clydebank
 Dunn Street, Dalmuir
 Duntocher Road, Parkhall
In 2014, it closed its Hardgate food store, reducing the number of its food stores from seven to six. The Hardgate store later reopened as a Co-op/KeyStore More and continues to trade.

See also
 British co-operative movement

References

External links
 Clydebank Co-operative Society
 Clydebank Co-op Board, 1881
 Clydebank Co-op Charabanc, 1922
 TheClydebankStory: history and photographs of Co-op enterprises – via Google

Consumers' co-operatives of the United Kingdom
Retail companies established in 1881
Companies based in West Dunbartonshire
Co-operative, Clydebank
1881 establishments in Scotland
Co-operatives in Scotland
Clydebank